The list of shipwrecks in 1803 includes ships sunk, foundered, wrecked, grounded, or otherwise lost during 1803.

January

1 January

2 January

4 January

6 January

8 January

9 January

10 January

11 January

12 January

17 January

19 January

20 January

21 January

25 January

26 January

27 January

28 January

31 January

Unknown date

February

1 February

2 February

4 February

11 February

13 February

16 February

17 February

19 February

21 February

23 February

25 February

26 February

27 February

28 February

Unknown date

March

3 March

7 March

14 March

16 March

19 March

21 March

23 March

26 March

27 March

Unknown date

April

1 April

14 April

15 April

17 April

18 April

19 April

22 April

23 April

Unknown date

May

2 May

6 May

9 May

14 May

15 May

22 May

29 May

31 May

Unknown date

June

11 June

13 June

14 June

17 June

28 June

Unknown date

July

2 July

14 July

21 July

29 July

30 July

Unknown date

August

17 August

18 August

29 August

Unknown date

September

3 September

4 September

12 September

17 September

20 September

21 September

22 September

28 September

30 September

Unknown date

October

1 October

4 October

8 October

9 October

12 October

13 October

14 October

15 October

16 October

17 October

18 October

22 October

25 October

29 October

30 October

31 October

Unknown date

November

1 November

2 November

3 November

4 November

5 November

6 November

8 November

9 November

10 November

11 November

12 November

13 November

14 November

15 November

17 November

18 November

19 November

20 November

20 November

22 November

23 November

24 November

25 November

26 November

28 November

29 November

30 November

Unknown date

December

1 December

5 December

6 December

9 December

10 December

11 December

12 December

14 December

15 December

16 December

17 December

18 December

19 December

20 December

21 December

22 December

23 December

24 December

25 December

26 December

27 December

29 December

30 December

31 December

Unknown date

Unknown date

References

1803